Olamsurhy, formerly Kausy, is a village in Burguçy geňeşligi, Köýtendag District, Lebap Province, in eastern Turkmenistan near the border with Afghanistan. Prior to 10 November 2022 it was under jurisdiction of Döwletli District, which was abolished on that date.

Transportation
Olamsurhy is served by the Burguçy railroad station and is located a short distance from the P-37 highway connecting Kerki and Kelif.

See also 
List of cities, towns and villages in Turkmenistan

References

External links
Satellite map at Maplandia.com

Populated places in Lebap Region